Li Ling (born 6 July 1989 in Puyang, Henan) is a Chinese athlete, who specialises in the pole vault.

She competed at the 2006 World Junior Championships, but no-heighted in the final. She achieved indoor and outdoor personal bests in 2008, clearing 4.45 metres indoors in Beijing in February and repeating the feat outdoors two months later in Hangzhou.

She represented her country at the 2008 Summer Olympics but her mark of 4.15 m in the qualifying round was not enough to progress to the final. She fared better at the 2009 World Championships in Athletics, but her season's best mark of 4.40 m was ten centimetres off making the final competition.

She matched her personal best to take the gold medal at the 2009 Asian Indoor Games. The vault was one centimetre off Zhang Yingning's Asian record in the event.

On September 8, 2013 she achieved a new Asian record at the Chinese National Games in Shenyang, China with 4.65 m.

Competition record

Personal bests

All information taken from IAAF profile.

References

External links

Team China 2008

1989 births
Living people
People from Puyang
Athletes from Henan
Chinese female pole vaulters
Olympic athletes of China
Athletes (track and field) at the 2008 Summer Olympics
Athletes (track and field) at the 2012 Summer Olympics
Athletes (track and field) at the 2016 Summer Olympics
Asian Games gold medalists for China
Asian Games silver medalists for China
Asian Games medalists in athletics (track and field)
Athletes (track and field) at the 2010 Asian Games
Athletes (track and field) at the 2014 Asian Games
Athletes (track and field) at the 2018 Asian Games
World Athletics Championships athletes for China
Universiade medalists in athletics (track and field)
Medalists at the 2010 Asian Games
Medalists at the 2014 Asian Games
Medalists at the 2018 Asian Games
Universiade gold medalists for China
Asian Athletics Championships winners
IAAF Continental Cup winners
Asian Games gold medalists in athletics (track and field)
Medalists at the 2015 Summer Universiade
Athletes (track and field) at the 2020 Summer Olympics